Yesyes, often stylized as yesyes, is a Hungarian downtempo and drum and bass duo formed in 2015 by Ádám Szabó (lead singer, accordion) and Tamás Katona (drums). Márk Vereb was also a member but is no longer with the group.

On 6 December 2017, it was announced by Duna TV that yesyes would participate in A Dal 2018, the 2018 edition of the Hungarian national selection process for the Eurovision Song Contest 2018 in Lisbon, Portugal with the song I Let You Run Away. They reached the superfinal. They also competed in the 2019 edition with the song Incomplete, where they were eliminated in the semi-finals.

Discography
Most Még Faj (Single, 2021)
Gyengéden (Single, 2020)
Darkness (Single, 2020)
save me now (Single, 2020)
Sun Goes Down (Single, 2019)
Hiába Ér Véget A Nyár (Single, 2019)
Incomplete (Single, 2018)
I Let You Run Away (Single, 2017)
Te meg én (Single, 2017)
Up on the sky (Single, 2017)
Cycle (EP, 2017)
Pollyanna (EP, 2016)

References

External links

http://recorder.blog.hu/2016/08/15/klippremier_yesyes_papers
http://www.glamour.hu/monitor/exkluziv-a-nyar-legutosebb-slageret-ez-a-ket-magyar-srac-hozta-ossze-ok-a-yesyes-23493
http://www.petofilive.hu/2016/12/14/nalunk-debutal-a-yesyes-live-session-videoja/
http://www.shortscore.net/2016/09/07/uj-magyar-downtempo-drumandbass-zenekar-lathataron/

Musical groups established in 2015
Hungarian musical groups
Drum and bass duos
2015 establishments in Hungary